Mikhail Grigoryevich Girshovich (1904–1947), was a major general in the Red Army.

Early life and education
Girshovich was born into a Jewish family of officials in Russian-occupied Poland. He finished 4 classes of Jewish schooling and moved to Belorussia.

Career

Red Army
Girshovich joined the Soviet Red Army in 1920. In 1926, he graduated Moscow artillery school and in 1938 graduated the anti-aircraft artillery course.

World War II
 Deputy commander of Army Air Defense.

Girshovich was head of Moscow Anti-aircraft warfare from 1942 to 1943.
 
Girshovich was the head of the Red Army Anti-aircraft warfare from 1944 to 1945.

He became the head of the Amur PVO Army, Deputy Far East PVO Commander in 1946 and died in 1947 serving in that capacity.

References
General Girshovich on Generals.dk

1904 births
1947 deaths
Jews from the Russian Empire
People from Kutno
Recipients of the Order of Kutuzov, 1st class
Recipients of the Order of Lenin
Recipients of the Order of the Red Banner
Soviet Jews
Soviet Jews in the military
Soviet major generals
Soviet military personnel of World War II
Soviet people of Polish-Jewish descent